Alan William Hahn (born June 19, 1971) is a sports talk radio host on ESPN Radio and a studio analyst on the MSG Network.

Early life and education 

Hahn is a Long Island native born in Smithtown, New York. He learned how to read as a child by sounding out headlines in his hometown newspaper, Newsday. Hahn attended St. Anthony's High School in South Huntington, New York, where he played varsity basketball in the Catholic High School Athletic Association.

Hahn later earned a basketball scholarship at LIU Post under NCAA Division II coach Tom Galeazzi. At LIU Post, Hahn wrote for the school newspaper The Pioneer, where he met current Newsday sportswriter Tom Rock.  Hahn earned a Bachelor of Science degree in journalism at LIU Post.

Sportswriting career 

Hahn started his journalism career at Newsday in 1995 as a part-time sports department clerk. He went from answering phones to covering high school games over the next year. In 1999, Hahn was promoted to full-time and was assigned to the New York Islanders beat. He earned the paper's prestigious "Publisher's Award" in 2000 for Sports Writing. He covered the Islanders until 2006, when he was moved to the New York Knicks beat. He developed a large following for his coverage of the Knicks and for his popular blog, The Knicks Fix.

In 15 years at Newsday, Hahn covered every professional team in the Metropolitan New York area, including two Stanley Cup runs by the New Jersey Devils hockey team and two seasons as the backup writer for the New York Jets football team.

Broadcasting career 

Hahn appeared as a regular guest on Knicks Night Live on the MSG Network in the summer of 2010 and was used as an occasional analyst on Knicks game broadcasts on MSG Network during the 2010-11 season. Following the 2011 NBA lockout, Hahn left Newsday and was hired by MSG Network to serve as studio analyst on all Knicks home and away games, where he works with fellow Long Islander, and former NBA All-Star, Wally Szczerbiak.

In 2012, Hahn was named host of The Mike Woodson Show, which airs weekly during the season on the MSG Network. Hahn also hosts a pregame segment, The Knicks Fix, which appears before every home game broadcast.

Also that year, Hahn started appearing as a regular fill-in host on ESPN Radio in New York. In 2014, he teamed up with former New York Islanders goalie Rick DiPietro to form the "Hahn & Humpty Show", which began weeknights. The popular show was quickly moved up into a mid-day time slot and added former Super Bowl champion Chris Canty to form "Hahn, Humpty & Canty." The show was simulcast on MSG Network in the summer of 2016 and 2017. In August 2017, Hahn left the show to host his own daily show, "Hahn Solo," which aired evenings on the station. 

In January 2020, Hahn moved back to the mid-day schedule to team up with former NFL linebacker Bart Scott for the "Bart & Hahn Show" which airs weekdays from 12-3 p.m. on ESPN Radio. The show was moved to ESPN Radio's national format on Jan. 5, 2021. Hahn frequently fills in as host of "Keyshawn, JWill, and Max".

Other sports media 

Hahn has written five sports books over his career, including the popular 100 Things Knicks Fans Must Know and Do Before They Die (Triumph, 2012), The New York Knicks: An Illustrated History (MVP Books, 2012), Bruin Redemption: The Stanley Cup Returns to Boston (F&W Media, 2011), Birth of a Dynasty: The 1980 New York Islanders (Sports Publishing LLC, 2004) and Fish Sticks: The Fall and Rise of the New York Islanders (Sports Publishing LLC, 2003), which he co-wrote with Peter Botte of the New York Daily News.

Hahn appeared in the acclaimed documentary, Big Shot, which was directed and narrated by Kevin Connolly and was part of the ESPN Films 30-for-30 series in 2013.

Awards 

In 2000, after his first year as a full-time staff writer, Hahn received Newsday's prestigious Publisher's Award for Sports Writing.

In 2013, Hahn received his first Emmy Award for his role in "Friday Night Knicks" on MSG Networks, which won the Live Sports Event: Series category for the 2011-12 season. He has since been part of four Emmy Award-winning broadcasts with MSG. 

In 2017, the Hahn & Humpty Show won "Outstanding On-Air Broadcasting Team" award by the New York State Broadcasters Association.

Citations

References

1971 births
Living people
American talk radio hosts
American sports announcers
LIU Post alumni
Sportspeople from Smithtown, New York